Thomas Astley (died 1759) was a bookseller and publisher in London in the 18th century. He ran his business from Saint Paul's Churchyard (circa 1726-1742) and Paternoster Row (circa 1745). He belonged to the Company of Stationers. He published the celebrated Voyages and Travels which described localities in Africa and Asia, compiling information from travel books by John Atkins, Jean Barbot, Willem Bosman, Theodor de Bry, Francis Moore, Jean-Baptiste Labat, Godefroi Loyer, Thomas Phillips, William Smith, and Nicolas Villaut de Bellefond. It included engravings by G. Child and Nathaniel Parr. Astley intended his Voyages to improve upon the previous travel collections of Samuel Purchas, John Harris, and Awnsham & John Churchill. It was read by patrons of Hookham's Circulating Library, Boosey's circulating library, London Institution, Royal Institution, Salem Athenaeum, and Cape Town public library. Astley's Voyages was translated into German and French.

Titles issued by Astley
 London Magazine
 
 
 
 
 
 
 
  + Index
 v.1 (via Google Books). "First voyages of the Portugueze to the East Indies, 1418-1546. First voyages of the English to Guinea, and the East Indies, 1552-1598. First voyages of the English to the East Indies, set forth by the company of merchants, 1600-1620. Voyages to Africa and the islands adjacent, 1455-1721"
 v.2 (via University of Virginia). "Voyages and travels along the western coast of Africa, 1637-1735. Voyages and travels to Guinea and Benin, 1666-1726. Description of Guinea"
 v.3. "Voyages and travels to Guinea, Benin, Kongo and Angola. Description of Loango, Kongo, Angola, Benguela, and adjacent countries. Description of the countries along the eastern coast of Africa, from Cape of Good Hope to Cape Guarda Fuy. Voyages and travels in China, 1655-1722"
 v.4 (via Google Books). "Description of China, of Korea, eastern Tartary and Tibet. Travels through Tartary, Tibet, and Bukhâria, to and from China, 1246-1698" + Table of contents
  (facsimile reprint)

References

Further reading

External links

 Digital Public Library of America. Digitized images from Astley's Voyages

Publishers (people) from London
English booksellers
1759 deaths
Year of birth unknown